The 2017–18 FIS Ski Flying World Cup was the 21st official World Cup season in ski flying. The winner was awarded with small crystal globe as the subdiscipline of FIS Ski Jumping World Cup.

Calendar

Map of World Cup hosts

Men

Team

Standings

Ski Flying

References 

World cup
FIS Ski Flying World Cup